Reis Peggie (born 21 February 1999) is a Scottish professional footballer who currently plays for Kelty Hearts.

Career

Youth Teams 
Peggie started his youth career at Falkirk. Peggie then moved to Celtic in 2013. After three years with the Hoops, Peggie returned to Falkirk.

Alloa Athletic 
On 17 July Peggie joined Scottish Championship team Alloa Athletic F.C. after impressing in pre-season friendlies. He received an injury playing against Edinburgh City early in the season after landing awkwardly and breaking his arm. He returned to action for the game against Greenock Morton on 12 January 2019 as a substitute.

East Stirlingshire 
In 2019, Peggie joined Lowland League side East Stirlingshire where he won the Young Player of the Year award in his first season.

Kelty Hearts 
Peggie signed with Kelty Hearts on 21 June 2021.

Bo’ness United 
Peggie joined Lowland League side Bo’ness United on loan in 2021.

Career Statistics

Club 

*other are Challenge Cup games.

References 

1999 births
Living people
Scottish footballers
Alloa Athletic F.C. players
Association football midfielders
Scottish Professional Football League players
East Stirlingshire F.C. players
Kelty Hearts F.C. players